Chwalimierz  is a village in the administrative district of Gmina Środa Śląska, within Środa Śląska County, Lower Silesian Voivodeship, in south-western Poland. 

Prior to 1945 it was in Germany.

The merchant Georg von Kramsta had a Neo-Renaissance palace built here around the year 1885, that was destroyed during World War II.

See also
 Średzka Woda

References

Chwalimierz

Palaces in Poland